Martin Lambert (born 24 September 1965) is an English former professional footballer who played as a forward.

References

1965 births
Living people
Footballers from Southampton
English footballers
Association football forwards
Brighton & Hove Albion F.C. players
Torquay United F.C. players
Le Havre AC players
CS Sedan Ardennes players
Wycombe Wanderers F.C. players
English Football League players
English expatriate footballers
Expatriate footballers in France
Expatriate footballers in the Netherlands
Expatriate footballers in Belgium